Juncus alpinoarticulatus, called the northern green rush and the alpine rush, is a species of flowering plant in the genus Juncus, with a circumboreal distribution. It prefers wet sandy soils, peat bogs, acidic fens, and ditches.

Subtaxa
The following subspecies are currently accepted:
Juncus alpinoarticulatus subsp. alpestris (Hartm.) Hämet-Ahti – northern Europe, Iceland
Juncus alpinoarticulatus subsp. alpinoarticulatus – Europe, Morocco, Caucasus
Juncus alpinoarticulatus subsp. americanus (Farw.) Hämet-Ahti – Greenland,  North America, Russian Far East
Juncus alpinoarticulatus subsp. fischerianus (Turcz. ex V.I.Krecz.) Hämet-Ahti –Asia, northeastern Europe
Juncus alpinoarticulatus subsp. fuscescens (Fernald) Hämet-Ahti – central USA
Juncus alpinoarticulatus subsp. rariflorus (Hartm.) Holub – northern Europe to western Siberia

References

alpinoarticulatus
Plants described in 1785